Puilly-et-Charbeaux is a commune (municipality) in the Ardennes department in northern France, bordering Belgium. The municipality has two villages: Charbeaux and Puilly-et-Charbeaux, the latter is the larger one and is sometimes called Puilly.
In France Puilly-et-Charbeaux borders no less than 9 other municipalities: Auflance, Moiry, Fromy, Linay, Blagny, Les Deux-Villes, Tremblois-les-Carignan, Mogues and Williers.

Population

See also
Communes of the Ardennes department

References

Communes of Ardennes (department)
Ardennes communes articles needing translation from French Wikipedia